Morningside College is one of the nine colleges of The Chinese University of Hong Kong (CUHK).

Motto 
The motto of the College is Scholarship, Virtue, Service.

History
Morningside College was established in 2006 with generous and imaginative donations from the Morningside Foundation and the Morningside Education Foundation. The Scottish economist and winner of the 1996 Nobel Memorial Prize in Economic Sciences, Professor Sir James Mirrlees, was appointed the founding Master that same year. The fully residential College accommodates 300 students with communal dining three nights per week during term time. The College admitted its first cohort in 2010.

Facilities 
Morningside College consists of two buildings: Maurice R. Greenberg Building and the Tower Block. The building complex is equipped with gyms, laundry rooms, activity rooms and TV rooms. The two buildings are connected by a bridge. The dining hall is located at the basement level of the complex.

Campus location 

Morningside is located between the central campus and Chung Chi College, next to the Sports Centre at the eastern end of the University, directly beside S.H. Ho College. The College is set against the contour of the hills commanding a full view of Tolo Harbour and is within walking distance of the University Mall, Library and University station.

References

External links
Official website of Morningside College
Official College Facebook Page: Morningside College CUHK 晨興書院

Chinese University of Hong Kong